Decaux is a French surname. Notable people with the surname include:

Abel Decaux (1869–1943), French classical organist and composer
Alain Decaux (1925–2016), French historian
Alice Decaux (born 1985), French hurdler
Georges Decaux (1930–2015), French cyclist
Jacques Decaux (1918–2003), French sport shooter
Jean-Claude Decaux (1937–2016), French businessman

See also
Iphigénie Decaux-Milet-Moreau (1778–1862), French painter

French-language surnames